Social Change is a peer-reviewed journal that provides a forum for discussion in the field of social change and development, in as non-technical language as possible.

It is published quarterly in association with the Council for Social Development by SAGE Publications.

Abstracting and indexing 
Social Change is abstracted and indexed in:
 DeepDyve
 Dutch-KB
 EBSCO
 J-Gate
 OCLC
 ICI
 Portico
 ProQuest: Worldwide Political Science Abstracts
 ProQuest: Sociological Abstracts
 SCOPUS

References

External links
 
 Homepage

SAGE Publishing academic journals
Quarterly journals
Development studies journals
Sociology journals
Publications established in 2010